Yasaka Dam is a dam in the Hiroshima Prefecture of Japan.

References

Dams in Hiroshima Prefecture
Dams completed in 1991
1991 establishments in Japan